Haidergarh is a constituency of the Uttar Pradesh Legislative Assembly covering the city of Haidergarh in the Barabanki district of Uttar Pradesh, India. Bharatiya Janta Party candidate Dinesh Rawat won in last Assembly election of 2022 Uttar Pradesh Legislative Assembly election.

Haidergarh is one of five assembly constituencies in the Barabanki Lok Sabha constituency. Since 2008, this assembly constituency is numbered 272 amongst 403 constituencies

Members of Legislative Assembly

Election results

2022

2017
Bharatiya Janta Party candidate Baijnath Rawat won in Assembly election of 2017 Uttar Pradesh Legislative Elections defeating Samajwadi Party candidate Ram Magan by a margin of 33,520 votes.

See also
 List of constituencies of Uttar Pradesh Vidhan Sabha
Haidergarh

Notes

External links
 

Assembly constituencies of Uttar Pradesh
Barabanki district